Yusuph Babatunde Bakare (born January 29, 1985 in Osi) is a Nigerian football player currently with Kwara United F.C. of Ilorin.

Early life
Hails from Osi in the Ekiti local government area of Kwara State.

Career
He is otherwise called ‘Keshi', he started his professional career with the Calabar Rovers of Calabar (1999–2000), FAAN F.C. of Lagos (2000–2001), Crown F.C. of Ogbomoso (2001–2002), Bida Lions F.C. (2002–2003), Diskabog F.C. of Ilorin (2003–2004) and Kwara United F.C. of Ilorin (2005 to date). He was two time runner-up in the state FA Cup in Niger (2002) & Kwara (2003) and won the 2005 edition with Kwara United F.C.

References 

1985 births
Living people
Nigerian footballers
Association football defenders
Calabar Rovers F.C. players
Kwara United F.C. players
Sportspeople from Kwara State